Maudslay, Sons and Field was an engineering company based in Lambeth, London.

History
The company was founded by Henry Maudslay as Henry Maudslay and Company in 1798 and was later reorganised into Maudslay, Sons and Field in 1833 after his sons Thomas and Joseph, as well as Joshua Field joined the company. It specialised in building marine steam engines. The company produced a special steam-powered mill for the 1852 re-cutting of the Koh-i-Noor.

See also
 Great Wheel

References

External links

 Chronology of the company

Defunct shipbuilding companies of England
Defunct companies based in London
Engineering companies of England
1798 establishments in England
Manufacturing companies established in 1798
Manufacturing companies disestablished in 1900
1900 disestablishments in England
British companies established in 1798
British companies disestablished in 1900